The Ohio Wesleyan Battling Bishops are the sports and other competitive teams at Ohio Wesleyan University.  The men's and women's Bishops teams are NCAA Division III teams that compete in the North Coast Athletic Conference and the Mid-Atlantic Rowing Conference. The university sponsors 25 varsity sports, as well as several intramural and club teams.

History
The first athletic teams of the college date back to 1875, the year of the first organized football team, although fifteen years passed before official colors were selected and the football team started playing its intercollegiate contest. That year the team played three games with Ohio State University, losing all three.

In 1902, the Ohio Wesleyan team joined Case Tech, Kenyon, Oberlin, Ohio State, and Western Reserve in forming the Ohio Athletic Conference (OAC). The first gym of the college, Edwards Gymnasium, was dedicated in February 1906. Ohio Wesleyan's first varsity men's basketball team played its games in the facility the same year. 
 
The Ohio Wesleyan teams adopted their official nickname in 1925. During the same year, Ohio Wesleyan's official mascot became a grumpy-looking bishop dressed in a red robe.

Ohio Wesleyan's colors, crimson red and black, date back to 1875, the year when the university organized its first official football game.

Ohio Wesleyan's lacrosse team has a historic rivalry with Denison University.

In 2011, Jay Martin became the all-time college soccer coaching wins leader en route to winning the national championship.

Varsity teams

Facilities
The football, lacrosse and field hockey teams play in Selby Field, which has a capacity of 9,100. Other campus facilities include a Dornoch Golf Club the Ohio Wesleyan golf course. Branch Rickey Arena houses volleyball and basketball. Baseball & softball teams play at Littick Field. Tennis teams play at the Tennis Center, and the soccer teams play at Roy Rike Field.

Championship wins

 Men's Lacrosse
 4 Time NCAA Runner Up
 9 Time NCAA Final Four Participant
 NCAC Champions: '87, '88, '89, '90, '91, '92, '93, '95, '96, '98 '00, '01, '03, '04, '05, '07, '10, '11, '13
 NCAA Tournament Appearances: '75, '76, '77, '78, '79, '80, '81, '83, '85, '86 '87, '88, '89, '90, '91, '93, '95, '96, '97, '98 '99, '00, '03, '05, '06, '07, '08, '09, '10, '11 12, '13
 Men's Basketball
NCAA Division III 1988
 Men's Soccer
NCAA Division III 1998, 2011
 Women's Soccer
NCAA Division III 2001, 2002

See also
 List of Ohio Wesleyan University people

References

External links